Moddie Taylor (March 3, 1912 – September 15, 1976) was an African American chemist who specialized in rare earth minerals. He was one of the African American scientists and technicians on the Manhattan Project from 1943 to 1945, working to develop the atomic bomb. For his work on the Manhattan Project, he was awarded a Certificate of Merit Medal for his contributions by Secretary of War Robert P. Patterson.

Early life and education 
Taylor was born in Nymph, Alabama in 1912, growing up in the segregated South. His mother was Celeste (Oliver) Taylor and father was Herbert L. Taylor. His family subsequently moved to St. Louis where his father worked as a postal clerk. Taylor earned a B.S. in chemistry from Lincoln University in Jefferson City, Missouri in 1935, graduating as valedictorian. He remained at Lincoln University, teaching chemistry before deciding to pursue his graduate studies at the University of Chicago. There, he received an M.S. in 1939 and a PhD in 1943 specializing in rare earth minerals. His graduate thesis was entitled Acid-Base Studies in Gaseous Systems; The Dissociation of the Addition Compounds of Trimethylboron with Aliphatic Amines.

Research and career 
From 1943 to 1945, Taylor began working on the Manhattan Project as a research associate in the Metallurgical Laboratory. The researchers at the Metallurgical Laboratory worked on developing the casing for the atomic bomb. Following the war, he returned to his alma mater at Lincoln University School of Law continuing to teach chemistry before moving to Howard University in 1948 to become an Associate Professor of chemistry. He was promoted to full Professor in 1959 before leading the university's Chemistry Department from 1969 to 1976. He retired on April 1, 1976 as a Professor Emeritus.

At Howard, Taylor's research interests centered on the vapor phase dissociation of some carboxylic acids. In  1952, he was inducted into the Washington Academy of Sciences in recognition for this work and in 1956, he was awarded a research grant from the American Academy of Arts and Sciences to continue this line of work. He was recognized for his excellence in teaching by numerous scientific organizations and societies, including the Manufacturing Chemists' Association and the Washington Institute of Chemists. In 1960, he wrote the chemistry textbook First Principles of Chemistry, which became popularly used in colleges across the United States.

Awards and honors 

 Certificate of Merit Medal, 1946
 Inducted Member, Washington Academy of Sciences, 1952
 Top College Chemistry Professor, Manufacturing Chemists' Association, 1960
 Honor Scroll, Washington Institute of Chemists, 1972
 Fellow, American Institute of Chemists

Personal life 
Taylor married Vivian Ellis in 1937 and they had one son named Herbert Moddie Taylor. Taylor died on may 30, 1976 in Washington, DC.

References 

American chemists
African-American chemists
Manhattan Project people
1912 births
1976 deaths
University of Chicago alumni
Lincoln University (Missouri) alumni
Howard University faculty
20th-century African-American people